is a 2021 American drama film directed, produced, and edited by Mari Walker (in her directorial debut) from a screenplay she co-wrote with Kristen Uno. It stars Pooya Mohseni, Lynn Chen, Danny Jacobs, Nican Robinson, and Nikohl Boosheri.

The film premiered at South by Southwest on March 16, 2021, and was released in the United States on April 1, 2022, by Breaking Glass Pictures. It received generally positive reviews from critics.

Plot
Kris is a trans-woman from Phoenix, Arizona. A decade after abruptly breaking up with Naomi, the duo is reuniting for a single evening in Los Angeles. Kris is in town for a network security conference. She is taking care of her cousin's two children. Naomi, a professor, is a mother of two. Kris and Naomi talk about Kris's transition and their friendship. Naomi says she felt hurt when Kris broke up with her. Kris apologizes. Naomi, a performance artist, reveals she gave up on her dreams and moved back with her parents before meeting her husband, Jim. Kris encourages her to return to performing. Later, Kris reveals she broke up with the first person she ever dated since transitioning 13 years ago. The duo talks about Kris' gender reassignment surgery, dating, and spending time with your loved one. Kris tells Naomi that it is harder to be female than trans.

Naomi's colleague Peter Gleason flirts with the duo at a bar. He is on a date with a former student. Naomi calls her life a series of setbacks. Kris tells her that everybody's life is unique. Naomi introduces Kris to Martin, another of her colleagues, who flirts with her. Naomi drives home early to see her child. Naomi and Kris talk about having children. They go to the campus where Naomi works and visit her office. Naomi recalls their last night together. Kris apologizes again, they argue, and Naomi reveals Kris impregnated her before abandoning her. The real reason for the change in her career was her decision to keep the child. Naomi tells Kris that she will never be a mother. Kris says Naomi has no one to blame for her sad life. The last scene shows Naomi performing, lying down next to a painting of a pregnant belly before destroying the art, symbolically accepting who she is.

Cast
 Pooya Mohseni as Kris Ahadi
 Lynn Chen as Naomi Liu
 Danny Jacobs as Peter Gleason
 Nican Robinson as Martin
 Nikohl Boosheri as Julie

Production
The concept for the film arose in the summer of 2017, after Mari Walker wrapped the festival run of Swim, her first narrative short film. She wrote the screenplay with her housemate Kristen Uno. Her hopes for the film were to "provide a new perspective into the trans experience and spark a larger discussion around questions of identity, womanhood, and belonging. The aim of this story was never to focus on transitioning or trans-ness, but rather on the underlying humanity of these two characters and their lives." Funding the project proved difficult. Vanishing Angle approached several production companies for help financing it, but all of them declined due to Walker's lack of experience as a first-time director. The film was funded through Wefunder, a crowdfunding service recommended by Jim Cummings, who had used it to fund his own film The Beta Test around the same time. See You Then was filmed chronologically with the expensive Sony Venice 6K digital camera. It was shot in thirteen days in Los Angeles; filming wrapped on February 1, 2020.

Release
The film premiered at the South by Southwest film festival on March 16, 2021, in the Narrative Spotlight program. It was released in select theaters in the United States on April 1, 2022, by Breaking Glass Pictures, and on DVD and streaming on April 19.

Reception
On the review aggregator website Rotten Tomatoes, 97% of 35 reviews are positive, with an average rating of 7.3/10. The website's critical consensus reads, "A character-driven treat for fans of conversation-based drama, the well-acted See You Then offers a refreshing perspective on relationship stories and gender roles." Metacritic, which uses a weighted average, assigned the film a score of 69 out of 100 based on six critics, indicating "generally favorable reviews".

Nick Allen of RogerEbert.com praised the film's confidence, especially in its screenplay. He said the film "honors the gradual evolution of a long talk, so much that their literal pacing reads as its only unnatural flourish—they take several minutes to walk about two blocks. But that rhythm, of one step at a time, nearly takes on a hypnotic effect. It forces the viewer to slow down and drink it all in, and focus on what Kris and Naomi are not saying to each other." Sarah-Tai Black, writing for the Los Angeles Times, said "the film's greatest achievement is the ease with which it traverses the delicate territory of its characters’ lives without losing the sense of a past both shared and fractured in memory." In a less positive review, The Guardians Phuong Le wrote, "Despite its flaws, See You Then is an interesting opportunity to see trans talents in front of and behind the camera."

References

External links
 
 

2021 directorial debut films
2021 drama films
2021 LGBT-related films
American drama films
American LGBT-related films
Films about trans women
Films shot in Los Angeles
Transgender-related films
2020s English-language films
2020s American films